Too is the second album by the R&B band the S.O.S. Band, released on the Tabu label in July 1981. It was produced by Sigidi Abdullah.

History
The album peaked at #30 on the R&B albums chart. It also reached #117 on the Billboard 200. The album yielded two Billboard R&B chart singles, "Do It Now (Part 1)" and "You" They peaked at #15 and #64 respectively. The album was digitally remastered and reissued on CD with bonus tracks in 2013 by Demon Music Group.

Track listing

Personnel
The S.O.S. Band
Jason Bryant – keyboards, vocals
Billy Ellis – saxophone, vocals
John Alexander Simpson – bass, vocals
Mary Davis – vocals, percussion
James Earl Jones – drums, vocals
W. Sonny Killebrew – saxophone, flute, vocals
Bruno Speight guitar, vocals
Abdul Ra'oof – trumpet, trombone, vocals

Additional Personnel
Travis Biggs – keyboards, flute, harp
Fred Wesley – trombone
Darryl "Munyungo" Jackson – percussion
David Majal Li – alto saxophone
Rhonghea Southern – guitar, background vocals
Phyllis "Penny" Wanzo, Rosalyn Sweeper, Fredi Grace, Keith Rawls – background vocals
Ben Picone, William Henderson (concertmasters) – strings

Production
Sigidi – producer
Clarence Avant – executive producer
Steve Williams – chief engineer
Les Horn;  Assistant engineer
Fred Wesley – horns and strings arrangements
Joe Q. Hall, Scott Skidmore, Sabrina Buchanek, Peter Damski, Les Horn, Greg Webster, Richard Wells, Mark Ettle, Tony Chiappa, Louis Summers, Les Cooper, Mitch Gibson – assistant engineers
Steve Marcussen – mastering
Art Sims, 11:24 Design – art direction
Don Miller – photography (front cover)
David Randale – photography (back cover)
Nick Fasciano – logo sculpture

Charts

Singles

References

External links
 Too at Discogs

1981 albums
Tabu Records albums
The S.O.S. Band albums